The Schü-mine 42 (Schützenmine 42, "rifleman's mine model of 1942"), was a German anti-personnel mine used during the Second World War. It consisted of a simple wooden box with a hinged lid containing a  block of cast TNT and a ZZ-42 type detonator. A slot in the lid pressed down on the striker retaining pin, sufficient pressure on the lid caused the pin to move, releasing the striker which triggered the detonator.

The mine was cheap to produce and deployed in large numbers. As an early example of a minimum metal mine, it was difficult to detect with early metal detectors - the only metal present was a small amount in the mine's detonator.  

Experience has shown that the mine detector search coil must pass very close to the mine before any reaction is obtained.  Detection is still more difficult when the search is made in ground containing shrapnel. Also it is hard to locate the Schü mine by observation or probing because it is relatively small.

During the Normandy Campaign the British resorted to using explosive detection dogs to find them.

In his book ‘A CANLOAN Officer,’ Rex Fendick, serving with the 2nd Bn., The Middlesex Regiment, during the Normandy Campaign, mentions finding what was believed to be a German radio transmitter backpack. It transpired that the device was actually a Geiger counter used to detect Schu-Mines that had been daubed with a patch of radioactive paint.

See also
Similar mines
 PP Mi-D, PMD-6, PMD-7, PMD-57, Type 59, PMD-1

References

Anti-personnel mines
World War II weapons of Germany
Land mines of Germany
Weapons and ammunition introduced in 1942